Religious cosmology is an explanation of the origin, evolution, and eventual fate of the universe from a religious perspective. This may include beliefs on origin in the form of a creation myth, subsequent evolution, current organizational form and nature, and eventual fate or destiny. There are various traditions in religion or religious mythology asserting how and why everything is the way it is and the significance of it all. Religious cosmologies describe the spatial lay-out of the universe in terms of the world in which people typically dwell as well as other dimensions, such as the seven dimensions of religion; these are ritual, experiential and emotional, narrative and mythical, doctrinal, ethical, social, and material.

Religious mythologies may include descriptions of an act or process of creation by a creator deity or a larger pantheon of deities, explanations of the transformation of chaos into order, or the assertion that existence is a matter of endless cyclical transformations. Religious cosmology differs from a strictly scientific cosmology informed by contemporary astronomy, physics, and similar fields, and may differ in conceptualizations of the world's physical structure and place in the universe, its creation, and forecasts or predictions on its future.

The scope of religious cosmology is more inclusive than a strictly scientific cosmology (physical cosmology and quantum cosmology) in that religious cosmology is not limited to experiential observation, testing of hypotheses, and proposals of theories; for example, religious cosmology may explain why everything is the way it is or seems to be the way it is and prescribing what humans should do in context. Variations in religious cosmology include those such as from India Buddhism, Hindu, and Jain; the religious beliefs of China, Chinese Buddhism, Taoism and Confucianism, Japan's Shintoisim and the beliefs of the Abrahamic faiths, such as Judaism, Christianity, and Islam. Religious cosmologies have often developed into the formal logics of metaphysical systems, such as Platonism, Neoplatonism, Gnosticism, Taoism, Kabbalah, Wuxing or the great chain of being.

Abrahamic

Judaism and Christianity

Biblical cosmology

The universe of the ancient Israelites was made up of a flat disc-shaped Earth floating on water, heaven above, underworld below. Humans inhabited Earth during life and the underworld after death, and the underworld was morally neutral; only in Hellenistic times (after c.330 BC) did Jews begin to adopt the Greek idea that it would be a place of punishment for misdeeds, and that the righteous would enjoy an afterlife in heaven. In this period too the older three-level cosmology was widely replaced by the Greek concept of a spherical Earth suspended in space at the centre of a number of concentric heavens.

Ex nihilo

The belief that God created matter is called creatio ex nihilo. It is the accepted orthodoxy of most denominations of Judaism and Christianity. Most denominations of Christianity and Judaism believe that a single, uncreated God was responsible for the creation of the cosmos.

Islam

Islam teaches that God created the universe, including Earth's physical environment and human beings. The highest goal is to visualize the cosmos as a book of symbols for meditation and contemplation for spiritual upliftment or as a prison from which the human soul must escape to attain true freedom in the spiritual journey to God. Several citations from the Quran cosmologically note:

"And the heavens We constructed with strength, and indeed, We are [its] expander." (51:47) Sahih International

"Do not the unbelievers see that the heavens and the earth were joined
together (as one unit of creation), before We clove them asunder? We made
from water every living thing. Will they not then believe?"
(21:30) Yusuf Ali translation

"The day that We roll up the heavens like a scroll rolled up for books
(completed),- even as We produced the first creation, so shall We produce a
new one: a promise We have undertaken: truly shall We fulfil it."
(21:104) Yusuf Ali translation

Indian

Buddhism

In Buddhism, like other Indian religions, there is no ultimate beginning nor final end to the universe. It considers all existence as eternal, and believes there is no creator god. Buddhism views the universe as impermanent and always in flux. This cosmology is the foundation of its Samsara theory, that evolved over time the mechanistic details on how the wheel of mundane existence works over the endless cycles of rebirth and redeath. In early Buddhist traditions, Saṃsāra cosmology consisted of five realms through which wheel of existence recycled. This included hells (niraya), hungry ghosts (pretas), animals (tiryak), humans (manushya), and gods (devas, heavenly). In latter traditions, this list grew to a list of six realms of rebirth, adding demi-gods (asuras). The "hungry ghost, heavenly, hellish realms" respectively formulate the ritual, literary and moral spheres of many contemporary Buddhist traditions.

According to Akira Sadakata, the Buddhist cosmology is far more complex and uses extraordinarily larger numbers than those found in Vedic and post-Vedic Hindu traditions. It also shares many ideas and concepts, such as those about Mount Meru. The Buddhist thought holds that the six cosmological realms are interconnected, and everyone cycles life after life, through these realms, because of a combination of ignorance, desires and purposeful karma, or ethical and unethical actions.

Hindu

The Hindu cosmology, like the Buddhist and Jain cosmology, considers all existence as cyclic. With its ancient roots, Hindu texts propose and discuss numerous cosmological theories. Hindu culture accepts this diversity in cosmological ideas and has lacked a single mandatory view point even in its oldest known Vedic scripture, the Rigveda. Alternate theories include a universe cyclically created and destroyed by god, or goddess, or no creator at all, or a golden egg or womb (Hiranyagarbha), or self-created multitude of universes with enormous lengths and time scales. The Vedic literature includes a number of cosmology speculations, one of which questions the origin of the cosmos and is called the Nasadiya sukta:
{{quote|
<poem>
Neither being (sat) nor non-being was as yet. What was concealed?
And where? And in whose protection?…Who really knows?
Who can declare it? Whence was it born, and whence came this creation?
The devas (gods) were born later than this world's creation,
so who knows from where it came into existence? None can know from where
creation has arisen, and whether he has or has not produced it.
He who surveys it in the highest heavens,
He alone knows or perhaps He does not know."
</poem>
|Rig Veda 10. 129}}

Time is conceptualized as a cyclic Yuga with trillions of years. In some models, Mount Meru plays a central role.

Beyond its creation, Hindu cosmology posits divergent theories on the structure of the universe, from being 3 lokas to 12 lokas (worlds) which play a part in its theories about rebirth, samsara and karma.

The complex cosmological speculations found in Hinduism and other Indian religions, states Bolton, is not unique and are also found in Greek, Roman, Irish and Babylonian mythologies, where each age becomes more sinful and of suffering.

Jain

Jain cosmology considers the loka, or universe, as an uncreated entity, existing since infinity, having no beginning or an end. Jain texts describe the shape of the universe as similar to a man standing with legs apart and arm resting on his waist. This Universe, according to Jainism, is narrow at the top, broad at the middle and once again becomes broad at the bottom.

 of Ācārya Jinasena is famous for this quote:

Chinese

There is a "primordial universe" Wuji (philosophy), and Hongjun Laozu, water or qi.道教五方三界諸天「氣數」說探源 It transformed into Taiji then multiplied into everything known as the Wuxing.太極初探 The Pangu legend tells a formless chaos coalesced into a cosmic egg. Pangu emerged (or woke up) and separated Yin from Yang with a swing of his giant axe, creating the Earth (murky Yin) and the Sky (clear Yang). To keep them separated, Pangu stood between them and pushed up the Sky. After Pangu died, he became everything.

Gnosticism
Gnostic teachings were contemporary with those of Neoplatonism. Gnosticism is an imprecise label, covering monistic as well as dualistic conceptions. Usually the higher worlds of Light, called the Pleroma or "fullness", are radically distinct from the lower world of Matter. The emanation of the Pleroma and its godheads (called Aeons'') is described in detail in the various Gnostic tracts, as is the pre-creation crisis (a cosmic equivalent to the "fall" in Christian thought) from which the material world comes about, and the way that the divine spark can attain salvation.

Serer religion

Serer religion posits that, Roog, the creator deity, is the point of departure and conclusion. As farming people, trees play an important role in Serer religious cosmology and creation mythology. The Serer high priests and priestesses (the Saltigues) chart the star Sirius, known as "Yoonir" in the Serer language and some of the Cangin languages. This star enables them to give accurate information as to when Serer farmers should start planting seeds among other things relevant to Serer lives and Serer country. "Yoonir" is the symbol of the universe in Serer cosmology and creation mythology.

A similar set of beliefs related also to Sirius has been observed among Dogon people of Mali.

See also

References

Bibliography

External links
 

 
Cosmology